Helen Velando (born 3 December 1961) in Montevideo is a Uruguayan writer of books for children and young people. Velando books of adventures have become a referent of Uruguayan literature an infantile contemporary.

Early life and career 
Velando studied three years of law school but she left when she determined that art was the motor that moved her soul. She began to sing and to study theatre and puppets, and got to have a blues band. She had many jobs: she sold books, shoes and clothes, made surveys, wove, was a theater educator and scriptwriter for comedy television. In 1989 she began to write adaptations for theater. In 1993, the year in which she gained a Florencio Sánchez Prize as the best new actress, she published her first book. Her great step was in 1999 when, after four years without publishing anything, her book Detectives en el Parque Rodó was a great success in Uruguay.

Works 
Las increíbles historias de Superma-pupu, una pulga diferente (1993)
Una pulga interplanataria (1995)
Cuentos de otras lunas (1996)
Detectives en el Parque Rodó (1999)
Misterio en el Cabo Polonio (2001)
Detectives en el Cementerio Central (2002)
Fantasmas en la Sierra de las Ánimas (2002)
Los cazaventuras 1, 2 y 3 (2003, 2004, 2005)
Memorias de una gripe (2005)
Piratas del Santa Lucia (2005)
Cazaventura y el Tesoro de las Guayanas (2006)

References 

Uruguayan children's writers
1961 births
Living people
Uruguayan women children's writers
Uruguayan dramatists and playwrights
Women dramatists and playwrights
20th-century dramatists and playwrights
20th-century Uruguayan women writers
21st-century Uruguayan women writers
Women television writers
Writers from Montevideo